The San Francisco trolleybus system forms part of the public transportation network serving San Francisco, in the state of California, United States. Opened on October 6, 1935, it presently comprises 15 lines, and is operated by the San Francisco Municipal Railway, commonly known as Muni (or the Muni), with around 300 trolleybuses. In San Francisco, these vehicles are also known as "trolley coaches", a term that was the most common name for trolleybuses in the United States in the middle decades of the 20th century.

The Muni trolley bus system is complementary to the city-owned Muni bus services, Muni Metro and cable car system and the rail-bound regional Caltrain and Bay Area Rapid Transit systems. In addition, it shares some of its overhead wires with the F Market & Wharves streetcar line.

One of only five such systems currently operating in the U.S., the Muni trolley bus system is the second-largest such system in the Western Hemisphere, after that of Mexico City. The system includes the single steepest known grade on any existing trolley bus line in the world (22.8% in the block of Noe Street between Cesar Chavez Street and 26th Street on route 24-Divisadero), and several other sections of Muni trolley bus routes are among the world's steepest.

History 

Long a hub of streetcar development, San Francisco already had much of the overhead wire infrastructure necessary to deploy trolleybus service on existing city streets. A city ordinance requiring streetcars to use two operators also served to encourage trolleybus deployment. In April 1934, Col. Jno H. Skeggs of the State Highway Department urged the conversion of the No. 33 Line streetcar to "trackless trolley", as some of the tracks would have to be taken up for the construction of the Bay Bridge. By early August of that year, the Market Street Railway Company (MSRy), successor to the URR, applied to the State Railroad Commission to operate the first trackless trolley system in California; permission was granted by August 30, and the first trolleybus service started on October 6, 1935, using 9 coaches built by Brill. The No. 33 Line had been originally established in 1892 by the San Francisco & San Mateo Railway Company as the 18th and Park or 18th Street Branch route. That route initially ran along 18th from Guerrero to Douglass before being extended to Frederick and Ashbury including a sharp hairpin turn on the lower slopes of Twin Peaks at Market and Clayton by May 1894. The current 33-Ashbury trolleybus route still runs on a portion of that route. After riding the trackless trolley, the editor of the San Bernardino Sun published a rumor that all streetcar service would eventually be replaced with trolleybuses.

On September 7, 1941, Muni introduced its first trolleybus line to compete with MSRy, the R-Howard line, using vehicles built by the St. Louis Car Company. R-Howard was built on the original route of the sparsely ridden No. 35 streetcar line; MSRy's franchise to operate the No. 35 had expired at the end of the 1930s. The R-Howard line was introduced specifically so that Muni could undercut MSRy's prices on its parallel routes on Mission Street. The 35-Howard line originally ran from the Ferry Building along Howard, South Van Ness, and 24th to that street's intersection with Rhode Island. The routing for R-Howard followed a similar path from Howard & Beale along Howard and South Van Ness to South Van Ness & Army (now named Cesar Chavez). Although the overhead wires are still present along Howard, they are not used in revenue service. The present-day 14-Mission trolleybus route runs along Mission, parallel to the original R-Howard route on Howard. By 1944, the MSRy was in financial difficulties. Thus, at 5 am on September 29, 1944, Muni acquired its commercial competitor. Along with the routes and equipment, Muni adopted its competitor's more expensive seven-cent fare ($ adjusted for inflation). At the time, the R-Howard line used 9 trolleybuses over a  route (round-trip).

The city attorney's office had ruled that using trolleybuses instead of streetcars was not abandonment of service; this opinion would eventually be overturned in 1959, but not before Muni followed national trends in replacing most of its streetcar rail lines with trolleybus service in the 1940s and 1950s. The E-Union line was the first to be replaced with trolleybus service, which combined the route with R-Howard as the E-Union-Howard. Trolleybus operation on the new E line commenced on June 9, 1947; it was redesignated in 1949 and survives as the 41-Union. 8-Market was converted to trolleybus service in 1948. The deployment of new "trackless trolleys" was greatly expanded on July 3, 1949, when Muni rolled out trolleybus service to replace five former MSRy lines, including the 21-Hayes and 5-McAllister streetcar lines. In total, fourteen streetcar lines were converted to trolleybus service by 1951. With the closure of the B-Geary line on December 29, 1956, only five lines with dedicated rights-of-way (including those running through the Twin Peaks and Sunset tunnels) continued as rail-based streetcar lines. Those five lines ran 1940s-era PCC streetcars through the 1970s and were subsequently converted to the Muni Metro light rail system using Boeing-Vertol SLRVs.

Grade 
While many municipalities further converted their trolleybus systems to diesel buses during the middle of the 20th century, San Francisco maintained trolleybuses due to their ability to climb the city's notably steep grades and because electricity was available at extremely low cost from the city-owned O'Shaughnessy Dam.  Muni has stated that it is impossible for some lines to be replaced by regular buses. The system includes the single steepest known grade on any existing trolley bus line in the world, specifically 22.8% in the block of Noe Street between Cesar Chavez Street and 26th Street on route 24-Divisadero, and several other sections of Muni trolley bus routes are among the world's steepest.

On December 16, 1981, the 55-Sacramento line was converted from diesel motor coach service to trolleybus specifically to power the westward climb on Sacramento Street up Nob Hill, and just six weeks later, on January  27, 1982, route 1-California was revised to include the newly electrified sections of route 55, with the latter then discontinued. Before dieselization, the line on Sacramento had been operated using cable cars. At the time, Muni was also facing a severe shortage of available diesel motor coaches due to age and deferred maintenance, which would lead to the conversion of the 45-Greenwich diesel bus service to the 45-Union-Van Ness trolleybus in 1982 as a temporary experiment later made permanent. A year after being lengthened, route 24-Divisadero was converted to trolleybus operation in 1983. In 1993, the last major electric conversion took place when route 31-Balboa was partially converted to trolleybus service. Full implementation was delayed until 1994, when accessible Flyer E60 trolleybuses became available. Coming full circle, at the end of 1995 the 8-Market trolleybus line was replaced by the F-Market & Wharves streetcar line using refurbished PCCs. The overwhelming popularity of the new F line allowed Muni to reduce the frequency of and then discontinue the 8-Market, though the overhead wires remain in place.

Approximately  of the daily riders on Muni are carried on trolleybuses; in 2010, that was 227,000 passenger boardings per weekday.

Lines 
Trolley buses currently operate the following Muni routes:

Fleet 

Since the start of service in 1935 (on the Market Street Railway system), the San Francisco trolleybus system fleet has included vehicles built by many different manufacturers, including the J. G. Brill Company, the St. Louis Car Company, Marmon-Herrington, Twin Coach, Flyer Industries (now New Flyer), and Electric Transit.

Early fleet (Brill, St. Louis) 
Market Street Railway was the first transit organization in San Francisco to run trackless trolleys, using nine coaches built by Brill in 1935 for the 33 line, numbered 51–59. Shortly after Muni assumed MSRy's operations in 1944, the Brill coaches were replaced by newer trolleybuses built for Muni and transferred to supplemental rush hour service by 1946. All of the Brill coaches were scrapped by 1954.

Muni commissioned its first trolleybuses from the St. Louis Car Company in 1939, and they were built in that year but were not placed into service until 1941. These were 40-seat coaches. Like the earlier Brills built for MSRy, the first set of nine St. Louis coaches used motors from GE and Westinghouse. Numbered 501–509, they went into service on the R-Howard Line in 1941. A second order in 1947 for 16 slightly larger coaches completed the first fleet of 25 coaches for Muni.

Replacing streetcars (Marmon, Twin Coach, St. Louis) 
The Muni trackless trolley fleet was expanded starting in 1947 as streetcar service was being replaced. Muni primarily purchased trolleybuses from Marmon-Harrington in three different sizes: the "Baby Marmons" in 1947 (Model TC40, numbered 526–549, 40 seats), followed by "Medium Marmons" in 1949 (Model TC44, numbered 550–569 and 660–739, 44 seats), and finally "Large Marmons" in 1950 (Model TC48, numbered 740–849, 48 seats).The Baby Marmons were relegated to supplemental service by 1954 and retired by 1961; most were scrapped, with few exceptions, by 1969.

In addition, Muni ordered 90 trolleybuses from Twin Coach comparable to the Medium Marmons in 1949 (Model 44TTW, numbered 570–659, 44 seats). The final expansion of the trolleybus fleet in the 1950s was accomplished by purchasing 40 48-seat coaches from the St. Louis Car Company in the early 1950s. The mixed fleet of Medium and Large Marmon, Twin Coach, and St. Louis trolleybuses would serve Muni throughout the 1960s and well into the 1970s; by the time Muni was ready to replace its trolleybuses, however, no American manufacturer was willing to build a new trolleybus. Muni turned to Flyer Industries, a Canadian manufacturer who was still building trolleybuses for their domestic market.

Flyer and New Flyer 

By 1977, with the delivery of more than 300 Flyer E800 trolleybuses, Muni was able to retire its existing fleet of trolleybuses; the newest of those (outside the Flyers) was by then more than 25 years old. A significant portion of the legacy Marmon/St. Louis fleet was sold to Mexico City.

As the fleet of Flyer trolleybuses aged, reliability declined. By 1995, the MDBF had fallen to just , and each breakdown was taking an average of 4 days to fix, often compounded by the unavailability of parts for the E800s, which were nearly 20 years old at that point. In addition, a number of incidents where poles had detached from the wires and subsequently struck pedestrians and vehicles gained publicity at the time.

In 1993, Muni procured a fleet of 60 New Flyer E60s, that agency's first use of articulated trolleybuses. Muni was the only customer for the E60 trolleybus variant of the New Flyer Galaxy; a prototype was built in 1992 and numbered 7000 for evaluation before the larger purchase was completed. The New Flyer E60 fleet subsequently were blamed for increasing the fleet accident rate. By 1996, the fleet average was 12.5 accidents per  traveled; in comparison, the E60 rate was 26 accidents over the same distance. They gained a reputation as the most difficult buses in drive system-wide, and were often driven by the least experienced drivers, as their increased capacity meant they were used on the busiest lines, which were relegated to drivers with the least seniority.

In 2001, the first known trolleybus fire occurred aboard No. 5204, a Flyer E800 that was over 20 years old. At that point, procurement of the successor ETI 14TrSF replacement vehicles was already underway.

At that time, the New Flyer E60 fleet was approaching 20 years old, and buses were breaking down, on average, once every five days. 12 New Flyer E60s were retired in early 2013, and the remaining 28 E60s were retired in early January 2015.

Electric Transit, Inc. 
The Electric Transit, Inc. (ETI) trolleybuses were delivered between 2001 and 2003, and came in two different models: 240 40-foot units (model 14TrSF) and 33 articulated 60-foot units (model 15TrSF), specially derived from the Škoda 14Tr and 15Tr, respectively, for use on the Muni system. The suffix SF in the two ETI model numbers stands for San Francisco. The total number of rigid (40-foot) trolleybuses was expanded to 240 with the new ETI 14TrSFs because of anticipated demand resulting from plans in the early 2000s to expand the trolleybus network. However, the expansion projects were not pursued after the Transit Effectiveness Project determined that minor changes to improve efficiency were all that were needed.

However, the new ETI trolleybuses proved to be overweight during testing.

Domesticated 14Tr trolleybuses that had been delivered earlier to Miami Valley RTA had some electrical issues related to the auxiliary power unit enabling off-wire operation; the cost of fixing those issues forced ETI to ask for a cash advance on its contract with Muni in 1999. The ETI trolleybuses were assembled at Pier 15; manufacturing started in the Czech Republic with frames, motors and controls, continued in Hunt Valley, Maryland, where the body, paint, under-flooring and wiring were added, and finished in San Francisco. The manufacturing activities were designed to meet "Buy America" regulations required for vehicles procured using federal assistance.

The 14TrSF displaced the prior Flyer E800 fleet, and the 15TrSF complemented the Flyer E60s. After the initial deployment of the ETI trolleybuses in 2002, the nuts securing the brakes to the axle were found to be loose. By January 2010, the exclusively high-floor Muni trolleybus fleet included 313 serviceable vehicles, comprising three different types, of which 240 were 40-foot conventional (two-axle) units, the ETI 14TrSF, and 73 were 60-foot articulated buses, 33 ETI 15TrSF and 40 New Flyer E60 vehicles built in 1993–94. Parts for the ETI trolleybuses needed to be shipped from the Czech Republic, increasing the time spent out of service.

However, as they aged, the ETI trolleybuses were temporarily pulled from service for repairs after several caught fire in 2014 and 2015. In a separate incident that occurred in 2016, the traction motor control circuit failed on ETI 14TrSF No. 5623 and the bus failed to respond to both the brake pedal and the emergency brake, rear-ending a parked delivery truck. By 2017, the 14TrSF fleet had aged to a point where they were collectively responsible for nearly half of all Muni service delays resulting from mechanical failures.

Return to New Flyer 

In 2013, the SFMTA adopted plans for an eventual one-for-one replacement of the existing trolleybus fleet in a joint procurement with King County Metro and New Flyer over technical specifications and pricing. The first order to be placed under the 2013 agreement was the 2014 order to replace the 61 articulated trolleybuses remaining in the fleet (28 E60 and 33 15TrSF) with 60 New Flyer XT60 articulated low-floor trolleybuses, delivery of which began in 2015. These are the trolleybus system's first low-floor vehicles. Two prototypes (Nos. 7201 and 7202) arrived in March 2015 and May 2015, respectively, and entered service in May and September 2015. Delivery of the 58 production-series vehicles began in September 2015, and the series entered service between November 2015 and July 2016.

The last of the 33 ETI 15TrSF articulated trolleybuses were retired in April–May 2016. These changes left the fleet with 240 conventional 40-foot units built by ETI (model 14TrSF) and 60 articulated New Flyer XT60s. In July 2016, an order for an additional 33 New Flyer XT60 articulated buses was placed via a first contract amendment, intended as an expansion of the 60-foot articulated fleet. Delivery of the 33 additional XT60 coaches was completed by March 2018. According to internal testing in November 2015, the New Flyer XT60 articulated trolleybuses are limited to routes with grades of less than 10%.

The second and final contract amendment under the 2013 agreement added an order for 185 two-axle, 40-foot New Flyer XT40 trolleybuses, which received final approval in June 2017. These vehicles will replace the remaining ETIs. Although Muni has options for an additional 55 XT40 trolleybuses (which would bring the total order to 240 40-foot XT40s as a one-for-one replacement of the ETI 14TrSF fleet), the option was not exercised because the first contract amendment in 2016 for 33 additional XT60 articulated trolleybuses provided sufficient system capacity. In the 2010 Fleet Management Plan, Muni anticipated the growth in ridership on routes served by trolleybuses would be accommodated by an increased proportion of articulated vehicles in the fleet. By September 7, 2019, the fleet of 40-foot ETI 14TrSF trolleybuses was withdrawn from service, which left the all-New Flyer fleet at 93 60-foot XT60s and 185 40-foot XT40s.

Current fleet 
The present fleet includes  trolleybuses and  articulated trolleybuses. Trolleybuses are assigned to Potrero and Presidio Divisions (garages), with the 60-foot articulated trolleybuses operating exclusively from Potrero.

Retired fleet 
The trolleybus system's original fleet, owned and operated by the Market Street Railway when only MSRy was operating trolleybuses in San Francisco, were built by the J. G. Brill Company. MSRy merged with Muni in 1944, and in the years since then the trolleybus fleet has also included vehicles built by the St. Louis Car Company, Marmon-Herrington, Twin Coach, and Flyer Industries.

Several trolleybuses have been preserved after serving in San Francisco:
 No. 506 (built by St. Louis Car Company in 1939, but not placed in service until 1941)
 Nos. 530 and 536 (Marmon-Herrington TC40, at Orange Empire Railway Museum (OERM))
 No. 614 (Twin Coach 44TTW, at OERM)
 No. 776 (Marmon-Herrington TC48)
 No. 5300 (Flyer E800)
 No. 5538 (ETI 14TrSf)

None of the retired ETI 15TrSF articulated trolleybuses have been saved for the historical fleet. An E60, vehicle 7031, was saved for four years until 2019, when it was sent to auction. Muni withdrew the auction for 7031 at the request of interested preservation groups.

Notes

Infrastructure 
 Market Street Railway (overhead lines)
 Stockton Street Tunnel
 Van Ness Bus Rapid Transit

See also 

San Francisco Municipal Railway fleet
List of trolleybus systems in the United States

References

Books

External links 

 SFMTA – official website
 Muni's Trolley Bus History
 

San Francisco Municipal Railway
Bus transportation in California
San Francisco
San Francisco
1935 establishments in California